Gurak-e Dezhgah (also Romanized as Gūrak-e Dezhgāh; also known as Dezh Gāh and Dezhgāh) is a village in Delvar Rural District, Delvar District, Tangestan County, Bushehr Province, Iran. At the 2006 census, its population was 433, in 106 families.

References 

Populated places in Tangestan County